The WhatsOnStage Award for Best Performer in a Female Identifying Role in a Musical is an annual award presented by WhatsOnStage.com as part of the annual WhatsOnStage Awards. Founded in 2001 as the Theatregoers' Choice Awards, the WhatsOnStage Awards are based on a popular vote recognising performers and productions in London's West End theatre.

This award is given to a person who has performed a leading female identifying role in a musical during the eligibility year. Introduced in 2001 as the award for Best Actress in a Musical, the category was renamed in 2022 in an effort to be more inclusive. The category was discontinued following the 2022 ceremony and was replaced with the gender-neutral WhatsOnstage Award for Best Performer in a Musical.

First presented to Samantha Spiro at the inaugural ceremony, Carrie Hope Fletcher is the leader in this category after winning three times. Imelda Staunton is the only other performer to win the award multiple times. Fletcher has also received the most nominations in this category, with four.

Winners and nominees

2000s

2010s

2020s

Multiple wins and nominations

Wins
3 wins
Carrie Hope Fletcher

2 wins
Imelda Staunton

Nominations
4 nominations
Carrie Hope Fletcher

3 nominations
Beverley Knight
Elena Roger
Jenna Russell
Sheridan Smith
Hannah Waddingham

2 nominations

References

External links
 Official website

British theatre awards
Awards for actresses